Alcmonacaris winkleri is an extinct Late Jurassic species of shrimp in its own genus, Alcmonacaris, which cannot yet be placed in a family. It was described in 2009 from a specimen in the Solnhofen limestone.

References

Caridea
Jurassic crustaceans
Monotypic crustacean genera